The Churchill Public School, also known as Churchill Elementary School, is a historic school located in Cheyenne, Wyoming, USA. Built in 1911, it is the oldest surviving public school in Cheyenne. The school is named for James Otis Churchill, Cheyenne's superintendent of schools for nearly two decades. The prominent Cheyenne architect William Dubois gave the school a Prairie design with an American Foursquare plan. It was the first of several schools designed by Dubois in Cheyenne. The two-story brick building has a stepped parapet along its flat roof.

The school was listed on the National Register of Historic Places in 2005.

References

School buildings on the National Register of Historic Places in Wyoming
Prairie School architecture in Wyoming
School buildings completed in 1911
Buildings and structures in Cheyenne, Wyoming
National Register of Historic Places in Cheyenne, Wyoming
1911 establishments in Wyoming